The 1908 Washington Senators won 67 games, lost 85, and finished in seventh place in the American League. They were managed by Joe Cantillon and played home games at National Park.

Offseason 
 October 5, 1907: Charlie Jones was traded by the Senators to the St. Louis Browns for Ollie Pickering.

Regular season

Season standings

Record vs. opponents

Notable transactions 
 May 31, 1908: Casey Patten was traded by the Senators to the Boston Red Sox for Jesse Tannehill.

Roster

Player stats

Batting

Starters by position 
Note: Pos = Position; G = Games played; AB = At bats; H = Hits; Avg. = Batting average; HR = Home runs; RBI = Runs batted in

Other batters 
Note: G = Games played; AB = At bats; H = Hits; Avg. = Batting average; HR = Home runs; RBI = Runs batted in

Pitching

Starting pitchers 
Note: G = Games pitched; IP = Innings pitched; W = Wins; L = Losses; ERA = Earned run average; SO = Strikeouts

Other pitchers 
Note: G = Games pitched; IP = Innings pitched; W = Wins; L = Losses; ERA = Earned run average; SO = Strikeouts

Notes

References 
1908 Washington Senators at Baseball-Reference
1908 Washington Senators team page at www.baseball-almanac.com

Minnesota Twins seasons
Washington Senators season
Washington